Wilmaure Derrick Louw (born 2 February 1987) is a South African rugby union footballer. His regular playing position is either centre or wing.

In 2013, Louw was included in a South Africa President's XV team that played in the 2013 IRB Tbilisi Cup and won the tournament after winning all three matches.

Louw was a member of the Pumas side that won the Vodacom Cup for the first time in 2015, beating  24–7 in the final. Louw made nine appearances during the season, scoring two tries.

References

External links

itsrugby.co.uk profile

Living people
1987 births
South African rugby union players
Rugby union centres
Rugby union wings
Griquas (rugby union) players
Pumas (Currie Cup) players
Cheetahs (rugby union) players
People from Upington
Rugby union players from the Northern Cape